Giovanni Boveri (Boverius) (Saluzzo, 1568-Genoa, 1638) was an Italian jurist, who became a Capuchin Friar Minor, taking the name Zacharias. He is known as a historian and theologian. According to the Catholic Encyclopedia he was  a “man of great learning not only as an historian, but as a controversial writer”.

Works
Orthodoxa consultatio de ratione verae fidei et religionis amplectenda (Cologne, 1626)
Annales Ordinis Minorum Capuccinorum (Lyon, 1632)

See also
 Boveri (disambiguation page)

References
Arthur von Schaching, Die Schrift des P. Zacharias Boverius o. cap. "Orthodoxa consultatio de ratione verae fidei et religionis amplectendae", Eichstätt 1937.

External links
 
 

1568 births
1638 deaths
17th-century Italian historians
17th-century Italian Roman Catholic theologians
Capuchins